The Silver Kangaroo is the highest award for adult leaders in Scouts Australia. It is awarded by the Chief Scout of Australia, on the recommendation of the Chief Commissioner of Australia. It is awarded for eminent achievement and meritorious service to the Association for a period of at least twenty years. It may be awarded to any member of a Scout Association affiliated with the World Organization of the Scout Movement.

The award consists of a medallion depicting a stylized silver kangaroo, suspended from a gold ribbon with two green stripes worn around the neck. The attendant uniform emblem, worn over the pocket, consists of a gold knot on a dark green background.

Recipients 
Notable recipients include John Ravenhall, Peter Blatch, Paul Parkinson, and A. Geoffrey Lee.

See also
 Bronze Wolf of World Scout Committee
 Silver Wolf of The Scout Association
 Silver Wolf of the Norwegian Guide and Scout Association
 Silver Wolf of Scouterna
 Silver Buffalo Award of the Boy Scouts of America
 Order of CúChulainn of Scouting Ireland
 Silver Fish

References

Scout and Guide awards
Scouting and Guiding in Australia
Australian awards